Cannibal Plateau is a summit in Hinsdale County, Colorado in the United States. The broad  mountain is located in the San Juan Mountains and within the Powderhorn Wilderness, a protected area managed by the Bureau of Land Management Gunnison Field Office and the Gunnison National Forest.

Cannibal Plateau was named after an incident of cannibalism by Alferd Packer.

Geology
Cannibal Plateau is composed of basaltic lava flows of the Hinsdale Formation, which are dated as 16 to 19 million years old. These lava flows are thought to be among the last volcanic events within the San Juan volcanic field and are therefore some of the best preserved. The Hinsdale Formation lava flows form an expansive alpine highland where the two highest ridges are Cannibal Plateau and nearby Calf Creek Plateau.

Hiking

The easiest route to the summit starts at the Powderhorn Lakes Trailhead located at the northern edge of the wilderness area. The Powderhorn Lakes Trail can be taken southwest . Where the trail turns southeast toward Powderhorn Lakes, leave the trail and continue  up the ridge through meadows and eventually alpine tundra to the broad summit of Calf Creek Plateau. From there it is a  hike southwest across the tundra to Cannibal Plateau. This requires descending down to the  saddle before climbing  up to the Cannibal Plateau summit. This includes the climb of  back up to Calf Creek Plateau on the return. The views along this alpine hike are expansive.

Cannibal Plateau can also be reached from the Devil’s Creek Trailhead to the west and the Deer Lakes, Brush Creek, and Powderhorn Park trailheads to the south. All these routes begin in subalpine forests before emerging into the scenic alpine landscape of the Powderhorn Wilderness.

References

External links
 

Landforms of Hinsdale County, Colorado
Mountains of Colorado